Omar Hamadi Stadium is a multi-purpose stadium in Bologhine, Algiers, Algeria. It is currently used mostly for football matches and is the home ground of USM Alger. The stadium has a capacity of 17,500 people.

History
The stadium was built in 1919 as the home ground for l’Association Sportive Saint Eugénoise. It was known as the Stade communal de Saint Eugène.

In 1957, the third platform will be built, consisting of two superimposed stands on the south side, arched and connecting the two original stands, this new platform will give a modern look at the municipal stadium.

After the independence of Algeria in 1962, the stage of St. Eugene will be called Bologhine new name for the town.

The upper gallery of the stadium was severely damaged at the piers during the 1980 El Asnam earthquake (currently Chlef) and has since remained off limits to the public and eventually – after endless work – being demolished in 2003.

In 1998, Bologhine stadium was renamed Omar Hamadi, a former leader of the club and revolutionary (he was sentenced to death during his country's war of independence) and who was tragically killed along with his two son at Bouzareah (Algiers) by a terrorist group in 1995.

In 2000 a new stand was built to expand the home stadium capacity, and spent 8,000 to 10,000 spectators, USM Alger club that holds the concession for the stadium has also invested in the development of infrastructure necessary for recovery and training for players: sauna, gym and restaurant.

External links
 StadiumDB page
 stade bologhine usmalger

References

Omar Hamadi
Buildings and structures in Algiers Province
Multi-purpose stadiums in Algeria
Sport in Algiers